Ollach  (in Scottish Gaelic, An t-Olach) is a remote settlement, made up of Lower Ollach and Upper Ollach,
lying on B883 road, south of Portree, Isle of Skye in the Highlands of Scotland. It is in the council area of Highland.

Ollach is opposite  Oskaig on the Isle of Raasay, and the nearest settlement of any size is Camastianavaig. The hamlet of Peinachorran and Balmeanach is directly to the south along the B883.

Populated places in the Isle of Skye